Fraser Octagon House is an historic octagon house located in Tatamagouche, Nova Scotia, Canada.  It was built in 1857 and is one and a half storeys. 

It features "Greek Revival pilasters and entablature at the front entrance"; "a wood frame shed"; and "prominent location on a corner lot".

It was recognized as a Nova Scotia Provincially Recognized Site under the Heritage Property Act on 31 March 1993.

References

See also
List of octagon houses

Houses completed in 1857
Octagon houses in Canada
Houses in Nova Scotia
Heritage sites in Nova Scotia
Buildings and structures in Colchester County
Tatamagouche
1857 establishments in the British Empire